Hearty and Hellish! is a live album of traditional Irish folk songs performed by the Clancy Brothers and Tommy Makem, recorded live at the Gate of Horn in Chicago. It was their second album for Columbia Records. In a January 1963 article, Time magazine selected Hearty and Hellish! as one of the top 10 albums of 1962.

Shanachie Records released the album on CD in 1993. It was reissued in 2009 in mp3 only format.

Reception
Robert Shelton, writing in The New York Times, favorably compared album to the group's Grammy-nominated first Columbia record, A Spontaneous Performance Recording. He considered Hearty and Hellish! to be "much more representative of these gifted performers", and he especially praised the number, "The 23rd of June", from the album.

Track listing

Side one
"Irish Rover"
"The Barnyards of Delgaty"
"October Winds" (a.k.a. "The Castle of Dromore")
"Courtin' in the Kitchen"
"The Jolly Tinker"
"Jug of This"
"Johnny McEldoo"
"Whiskey, You're the Devil"

Side two
"Mountain Dew"
"When I Was Single"
"The 23rd of June"
"The Rising of the Moon"
"God Bless England"
"Mr. Moses Ri-tooral-i-ay"
"Johnny, I Hardly Knew Ye"

Personnel
 Paddy Clancy - vocals, harmonica
 Tom Clancy - vocals
 Liam Clancy - vocals, guitar
 Tommy Makem - vocals, tin whistle
 Bruce Langhorne - guitar
 Frank Hamilton - banjo
 Herb Brown - bass

References 

The Clancy Brothers albums
1962 albums
Columbia Records albums